Box Butte County is a county in the U.S. state of Nebraska. As of the 2020 United States Census, the population was 10,604. Its county seat is Alliance. The county was formed in 1886; it took its name from a large box-shaped butte north of Alliance.

In the Nebraska license plate system, Box Butte County is represented by the prefix 65 (it had the sixty-fifth largest number of vehicles registered in the county when the license plate system was established in 1922).

History
Box Butte County was formed as part of a series of partitionings of the Nebraska Panhandle. In 1883, the Nebraska legislature divided the Panhandle into two counties, Sioux and Cheyenne. In 1885 the original Sioux County was divided into three counties: Sioux, Dawes, and Sheridan. Because of the distance to the county seat of Chadron, residents of southern Dawes County asked that it be split off; in 1886, the legislature created Box Butte County. The new county was named after a butte in the northern part of the county; prior to the county's formation, its name had been used in advertisements by railroad companies seeking to entice settlers to the area.

In the Nebraska license plate system, Box Butte County is represented by the prefix 65 (it had the 65th-largest number of vehicles registered in the county when the license plate system was established in 1922).

Geography

Major highways

 
  Nebraska Highway 2
  Nebraska Highway 71
  Nebraska Highway 87

Adjacent counties

 Dawes County - north
 Sheridan County - east
 Morrill County - south
 Scotts Bluff County - southwest
 Sioux County - west

Demographics

As of the 2000 United States Census, there were 12,158 people, 4,780 households, and 3,298 families in the county. The population density was 11 people per square mile (4/km2). There were 5,488 housing units at an average density of 5 per square ;mile (2/km2). The racial makeup of the county was 90.84% White, 0.37% Black or African American, 2.74% Native American, 0.53% Asian, 0.01% Pacific Islander, 3.55% from other races, and 1.96% from two or more races.  7.65% of the population were Hispanic or Latino of any race. 36.4% were of German, 8.4% English, 8.1% Irish and 5.3% American ancestry.

There were 4,780 households, out of which 35.60% had children under the age of 18 living with them, 57.70% were married couples living together, 8.30% had a female householder with no husband present, and 31.00% were non-families. 27.50% of all households were made up of individuals, and 11.10% had someone living alone who was 65 years of age or older.  The average household size was 2.50 and the average family size was 3.05.

The county population contained 28.10% under the age of 18, 7.40% from 18 to 24, 26.80% from 25 to 44, 23.10% from 45 to 64, and 14.60% who were 65 years of age or older. The median age was 38 years. For every 100 females there were 99.20 males. For every 100 females age 18 and over, there were 94.60 males.

The median income for a household in the county was $39,366, and the median income for a family was $46,670. Males had a median income of $36,966 versus $21,762 for females. The per capita income for the county was $18,407. About 9.70% of families and 10.70% of the population were below the poverty line, including 13.70% of those under age 18 and 11.00% of those age 65 or over.

Communities

City
 Alliance (county seat)

Village
 Hemingford

Census-designated place
 Berea

Other unincorporated places
 Letan
 Nonpareil

Politics
Box Butte County voters have been reliably Republican for decades; since 1940, the county has selected the Republican Party presidential candidate in every national election (as of 2020).

Notable people
 Robert Ball Anderson, early homesteader

See also
 National Register of Historic Places listings in Box Butte County, Nebraska

Notes

References
Kooiman, Barbara A., and Elizabeth A. Butterfield (1996).  .  Retrieved December 11, 2017.

External links
 County website

 
Nebraska counties
1886 establishments in Nebraska
Populated places established in 1886